Supernova, also known as Nova Omega and Garthan Saal, is a fictional character appearing in American comic books published by Marvel Comics. His first appearance was as an antagonist in The Avengers #301 in 1988.

As a Nova Corps officer, he was played by Peter Serafinowicz in the Marvel Cinematic Universe 2014 film in Guardians of the Galaxy.

Publication history
Supernova first appeared as the main antagonist in The Avengers Vol 1, #301-303. He later returned in The New Warriors Vol 1, #40-42 and Nova Vol 4.

Fictional character biography
Garthan Saal, a member of the Xandarian Nova Corps, was one of the few Xandarians who survived the destruction of Xandar at the hands of Nebula the space pirate.

Garthan Saal contained the power of the entire Nova Corps within his body which increased him to the size of a giant and drove him mad. Supernova's desire for revenge against Nebula led him on a quest to track her down and exact his revenge. He had heard that Nebula had recently been a member of the Avengers (in actuality this was a temporal counterpart to Kang's long lost love Ravonna who assumed the guise of Nebula).

Supernova first attacked the Avenger Star Fox (another alleged relative of Nebula's) in space which led to a confrontation between Supernova and the combined forces of the Avengers, Fantastic Four and fellow surviving Xandarian Firelord (a former herald of Galactus). Supernova was only defeated by tricking him into the timestream to find the woman he believed was Nebula as she had been lost in the timestream during a previous encounter with the Avengers.

Years later, Garthan Saal returned from the time stream even more crazed. He had come to realize that there was a small sliver of the Xandarian Nova Corps power that was still housed within the earthling Richard Rider a.k.a. Nova, a former member of the Xandarian Nova Corps and at that time a member of the New Warriors. Supernova came to earth and drained Nova of all his powers effectively killing him (ruining his date with Laura Dunham). Richard was resurrected thanks to another surviving Xandarian (and former herald of Galactus) named Air-Walker. Air-Walker and Firelord joined Nova and the New Warriors into a battle in space with Supernova. During the battle Supernova tried to drain a powerless Richard Rider again but this led to Richard himself having full control of the Nova Force. Nova was convinced by his friends to relinquish the power and use it to reboot the Xandarian Worldmind (A network that serves as a repository of all Xandarian knowledge, culture and power). Having done this the Worldmind resurrected the Xandarian race and Nova Corps was reborn. Nova was given more power but eventually was depowered again at which point Garthaan Saal became the Nova assigned for Earth and took the name Nova Omega. His appointment caused great friction between him and the depowered Richard Rider. Garthan  began tracking Volx the queen (and mother) of the Dire Wraiths. Volx murdered Garthan, who returned the Nova force to Richard Rider.

Malik Tarcel, a temporary Nova Prime during the second Kree-Shi'ar War, was captured by Shi'ar forces and tortured. After the torture was over, a man claiming to be Garthan Saal arrived to rescue him.

Supernovas
There was a black ops unit of the Nova Corps called the Supernovas. They were also called the Black Novas because their helmets were black instead of gold.

During the "Original Sin" storyline, Sam Alexander learned from the eye of the murdered Uatu the Watcher that its membership consisted of thieves and killers.

Membership
 Adomox - Leader of the Supernovas.
 Jesse Alexander - Member of the Supernovas and the father of Sam Alexander. He is currently a prisoner of the Chitauri. His whereabouts are unknown, but clones of him have appeared.
 Mister Z's - Member of the Supernovas. He was killed by the Chitauri.
 Phlish - Member of the Supernovas. He was killed by the Chitauri.
 Sam Alexander - He was a part of the Supernovas until he learned their true intentions.
 Titus - A white tiger-like alien who is a member of the Supernovas. He was killed by Sam Alexander when he activated the Ultimate Nullifier.

In other media

Film
 Saal appears in the 2014 film Guardians of the Galaxy, portrayed by British actor Peter Serafinowicz. In the film, he holds the rank of Denarian and reports to Nova Prime Rael of Gamora's capture. Saal is not corrupt with power like his comic book counterpart, but is stern and righteous with his position. He acts as commander of Nova Corps' fighter fleet, coordinating with Rocket and the Ravagers to protect the evacuation of Xandar and stall Ronan's ship, the Dark Aster, while the remaining Guardians board. He is killed after Ronan uses the Infinity Stone to break Dark Aster through the shield Nova Corps had created.

References

External links
 Supernova at Marvel Wiki
 Supernovas at Marvel Wiki
 

Characters created by Tom DeFalco
Comics characters introduced in 1989
Marvel Comics extraterrestrial supervillains
Marvel Comics supervillains
Marvel Comics extraterrestrial superheroes
Marvel Comics superheroes